Diamond Boy is the fourteenth studio album by the American rock band Enuff Z'Nuff. The album was released August 10, 2018 on Frontiers Records. It is the first Enuff Z'Nuff release to not feature their former lead singer Donnie Vie. Bassist Chip Z'Nuff performs the lead vocal duties on each track of the album.

Track listing 
The following track listing was adopted from iTunes. All songs written by Z'Nuff, Fenelle, Stoffregen, and Hill unless noted.

Lineup 

 Chip Z'nuff- Lead vocals, bass, guitar
 Tory Stoffregen- Lead guitar and slide guitar
 Tony Fenelle- Rhythm guitar and keyboards
 Daniel B. Hill- Drums and percussion

Reception 
Jason Mesa of immusicmag.com rated the album 8/10 stars, saying that "Faith Hope & Luv" was his favorite track off the album.

References

2018 albums
Enuff Z'nuff albums
Frontiers Records albums